Jang Do-young (also romanized as Chang Do-yong and variations thereof; ; 23 January 1923 – 3 August 2012) was a South Korean general, politician and professor who, as the Army Chief of Staff, played a decisive role in the May 16 coup and was the first chairman of the interim Supreme Council for National Reconstruction for a short time until his imprisonment.

Early life and education
Born in 1923, in Ryūsen-gun, Heianhoku-dō, Jang Do-young attended Sinuiju High School(middle school).
He graduated from the history department of Toyo University in 1944, planning to become a teacher, but instead attended and graduated from the Military Language School, the predecessor to the current Korea Military Academy.

Career

World War Two and The Korean War
Jang initially served in the Imperial Japanese Army during the Japanese occupation of Korea, and retired from the Japanese army after liberation with the rank of lieutenant. He was then commissioned into the army as a South Korean military officer. After serving as the commander of the 5th and 9th regiments, and as the head of the Army Counter Intelligence Corps, he commanded the 6th Infantry Division's forces, and during the initial stages of the Korean war his forces were defeated by Chinese forces at the battles of Sachang-ni, Hwacheon-gun, and Gangwon-do during the initial stages of the Chinese spring offensive. However, his forces quickly recovered and subsequently defeated the Chinese forces at the battle of Yongmunsan, making up for the defeat of the previous month.

Involvement in the May 16 coup

After the armistice, Jang became Army Chief of Staff at the age of 39 under the Cabinet of Chang Myon following the April 19 Revolution in 1960, but he was not loyal to his government. Jang first learned of the coup from Park Chung-hee on 10 April 1961, who wanted him to lead the new government so that the entire military would support it. He responded by neither joining the plotters nor notifying the government. This indecisiveness has been seen as giving legitimacy to the coup. In addition, Jang later convinced then-prime minister Chang Myon, that a security report containing leaked details of the coup (when it was scheduled to occur on May 12) was unreliable. This allowed the planners to postpone it to May 16.

Rise and decline
After the coup, Jang was appointed as a figurehead leader while Park held the real power. Soon afterwards, however, he formed a small faction of moderates, causing conflict with other more militarist officers, including Park. At his peak, Jang occupied four positions: chairman of the Supreme Council, prime minister, defense minister, and army chief of staff. Through May 1961, he attempted to gain recognition of the new government from the United States, meeting with John F. Kennedy on 24 May and promising a transfer to civilian control by 15 August (a priority for the US and president in name only Yun Posun, who Jang wanted to remain in office) on 31 May. These moves quickly made him unpopular with the rest of the military leaders, who saw him as a threat to their power and the goals of the coup. In June, after winning the acceptance of the US, Park and his followers turned the tide against Jang by implementing laws to restrict his influence. On July 3, Jang, the ten MPs posted around him for security, and forty-four other officers were arrested on charges of conspiring to execute a countercoup. He surrendered without any resistance.

Exile and later years
Before his trial, Jang had already made it clear that he would flee to the United States, a move his persecutors didn't object to. After leaving in 1962, he completed his doctorate in political science at the University of Michigan. Later, while teaching in the United States, he explained to an interviewer why he had been betrayed. In order to prevent Park Chung-hee's lust for power, he insisted on the transfer of power and explained that this was the case. The February 23, 1982 article from Korea JoongAng Daily, "Supreme Council for National Reconstruction, Issue 6" recalled, "Mr. Jang Do-young recently recalled that he 'tried to set the period of military administration at six months,'" he recalled. "I thought our troops were well trained and would be able to restore order in 6 months. 'Let's hold elections in 6 months and create a new civilian government to raise the country. Leave this matter to me, without saying a word,'" he insisted to the Supreme Council. His subordinates did not listen to him.

The fact that Jang Do-young called for an early transfer of power is supported by various testimonies. But such claims are not the only cause of his disappearance. Jang claimed that he had visited South Korea in 1968 and met with Park as well as troops who participated in the Vietnam War. He joined Western Michigan University as an associate professor in 1971 and retired in 1993. By 2011, it was reported that he was suffering from dementia. He died on August 03, 2012, from complications of  Parkinson's and Alzheimer's.

Works
Yearning for Home, autobiography, 2001,

Honors
Taegeuk Class Order of Military Merit
Silver Star Medal

Notes

References

Citations

Bibliography

Prime Ministers of South Korea
South Korean military personnel of the Korean War
South Korean generals
1923 births
2012 deaths
Chiefs of Staff of the Army (South Korea)
National Defense ministers of South Korea
Leaders who took power by coup
Western Michigan University faculty